Kathryn Bridget Moynahan (born April 28, 1971) is an American actress and model best known for her role as Erin Reagan in the police drama Blue Bloods. She graduated from Longmeadow High School in Massachusetts in 1989 and began pursuing a career in modeling. She appeared in department-store catalogs and magazines, and after doing television commercials, began taking acting lessons. She made her television debut in a guest appearance in the comedy series Sex and the City in 1999, where she later had a recurring role as Natasha.

She made her feature-film debut in Coyote Ugly (2000). She had supporting roles in Serendipity (2001); The Sum of All Fears (2002); The Recruit (2003); I, Robot (2004); Lord of War (2005); Grey Matters (2006); Prey (2007); Noise (2007); Ramona and Beezus (2010); John Wick (2014); The Journey Home (2014) and John Wick: Chapter 2 (2017).

She starred in the ABC television series Six Degrees, which premiered in September 2006, and was taken off the schedule after just eight episodes. Since September 2010, she has starred as an assistant district attorney in the CBS drama Blue Bloods.

Early life
Kathryn Bridget Moynahan was born April 28, 1971, in Binghamton, New York. She is the daughter of Irish Americans Mary Bridget (née Moriarty), a former school teacher, and Edward Bradley Moynahan, a scientist and former administrator at the University of Massachusetts Amherst. Moynahan has an older brother, Andy, and a younger brother, Sean, who work as a computer programmer and potter, respectively. When Moynahan was around seven years old, her family moved to Longmeadow, Massachusetts, where she later attended Longmeadow High School, and was captain of the girls' soccer, basketball, and lacrosse teams, graduating in 1989. She has said that during her childhood, she was a "tomboy".

Career

Early work
After graduating from high school, Moynahan pursued a modeling career despite admitting she had never read fashion magazines growing up. She had accompanied a friend to a modeling audition in Springfield, Massachusetts, and was signed by the modeling agency instead of her friend. She began her career appearing in department-store catalogs in Springfield, during which time she attended the University of Massachusetts Amherst.

Moynahan moved to New York City at age 18, and a year later, began appearing in magazines such as Vogue and Elle, and on covers of other widely known magazines. Her cover highlights include Vogue Paris (May 1993), Elle (October 1993), and Glamour (six times). Discussing her early work in an interview given in July 2004, Moynahan said, "It was a crazy world that paid a lot of money. I liked being a model, but I knew it would never last, so I looked into acting."

During that time, she began doing soap and shampoo commercials, in addition to taking acting and art classes.  She studied acting at the Caymichael Patten Studio in New York, and in 1999, made her TV debut as Natasha in HBO's romantic comedy Sex and the City. She later had a recurring role in the show, until the divorce of her character from Mr. Big (Chris Noth). The following year, she appeared in smaller film roles, including having parts in In the Weeds and Whipped.

Breakthrough
Moynahan made her feature-film debut in the 2000 comedy-drama Coyote Ugly as Rachel, a bartender and dancer in a wild New York bar, a role considered her breakthrough. She accepted the role because she "thought it was interesting that the whole movie revolved around five women…and my character was so strong and independent." The film received generally unfavorable reviews, but was a box-office success, earning $133 million worldwide. Her next role was a supporting role in 2001 film Serendipity as Hally, the fiancée of John Cusack's character.

Moynahan worked opposite Ben Affleck and Morgan Freeman in the action film The Sum of All Fears, based on Tom Clancy's book of the same name. She played Dr. Catherine Muller, a love interest for Affleck's Jack Ryan. Dave Larsen of the Dayton Daily News reported the subplot involving Moynahan and Affleck was "the film's weakest point". The film received ambivalent reviews, but was a commercial success, earning $193 million at the box office. Moynahan's next role was as a CIA trainee in The Recruit (2003). The movie was poorly received, with Mike Clark of USA Today calling it "a less-than-middling melodrama whose subject matter and talent never click as much as its credits portend".

In 2004, Moynahan worked alongside Will Smith in Alex Proyas' science-fiction movie I, Robot, loosely based on Isaac Asimov's short-story collection of the same name. She portrayed Dr. Susan Calvin, a specialist in robot psychology. The film received mixed reviews, though critics enjoyed Moynahan's performance. Daniel Neman of Richmond Times-Dispatch disliked the film, concluding that Moynahan "turns in an able performance as Dr. Calvin, the convenient character." With revenue of $347 million worldwide, the film remains Moynahan's most commercially successful picture to date. Her next movie was 2005's Lord of War, a political crime thriller, where she played Ava Fontaine Orlov, the wife of Nicolas Cage's character. In 2006, Maxim  named Moynahan #96 on its annual "Hot 100" list.

In September 2006, away from film, Moynahan worked as Whitney Crane in the ABC television drama series Six Degrees co-starring with Jay Hernandez, Erika Christensen, Hope Davis, Dorian Missick, and Campbell Scott. The series centered on six residents of New York City and their relationships and connections with one another, based on the idea of six degrees of separation. It debuted on September 20, 2006, and was watched by almost 13.3 million viewers. It debuted to varied reception, with David Hinckley of the New York Daily News writing, "In theory, it's an intriguing concept for a series. But in practice, Six Degrees doesn't work at all in drawing you in at the start." After one season, it was cancelled in May 2007.

Moynahan's next film role was in the November 2006 thriller Unknown, about a group of individuals kidnapped and trying to escape their captors together. She was next seen in 2007, in Gray Matters, working with Heather Graham and Tom Cavanagh, before being cast in Henry Bean's comedy-drama Noise as Helen Owen, the wife of David Owen (Tim Robbins). The movie was screened at a special presentation at the 2007 Rome Film Festival and released in theaters in 2008.

In December 2008, Moynahan guest-starred in two episodes of the ABC television comedy-drama Eli Stone as the titular character's (Jonny Lee Miller) ex-girlfriend. Returning to film, she appeared in Ramona and Beezus, as the mother to Joey King and Selena Gomez's characters. The film was directed by Elizabeth Allen and released in July 2010. The next year, Moynahan worked with Aaron Eckhart, Michelle Rodriguez and Michael Peña in the action science-fiction feature Battle: Los Angeles (2011), and starred in the CBS television show Blue Bloods, playing Assistant District Attorney Erin Reagan.

In November 2009, she signed a deal with Garnier to appear in television and print advertising promoting their Ultra-Lift skincare products.

In 2014, Moynahan appeared as the late wife of the title character in the action film John Wick, and appearing in the 2017 sequel. Most recently, in 2019, she starred in the action film Crown Vic.

Personal life
Moynahan lived with screenwriter Scott Rosenberg from 2001 to 2003. She dated NFL quarterback Tom Brady from 2004 until December 14, 2006. Her representative confirmed their split in a press release to People in December 2006, stating they had "amicably ended their three-year relationship."

On February 18, 2007, Moynahan's representative confirmed to People that she was more than three months pregnant and that Brady was the father. On August 22, 2007, she gave birth to their son.  She and Brady have maintained a cordial relationship.

In 2010, she moved from Pacific Palisades, California, to New York City when she was cast in Blue Bloods. She began dating director McG in late 2010.

On October 17, 2015, she married businessman Andrew Frankel at a ceremony in the Hamptons. Frankel has three sons from a previous
relationship.

Filmography

Film

Television

Books

References

External links

 
 

1971 births
Living people
20th-century American actresses
21st-century American actresses
Actors from Binghamton, New York
Actresses from Massachusetts
Actresses from New York (state)
American female models
American film actresses
American people of Irish descent
American television actresses
Female models from Massachusetts
Female models from New York (state)
People from Longmeadow, Massachusetts
People from Pacific Palisades, California